Oribazus is a genus of beetles in the family Carabidae, containing the following species:

 Oribazus catenulatus Chaudoir, 1874
 Oribazus quinquestriatus Chaudoir, 1874

References

Pterostichinae